Cormicy is a commune in the Marne department in north-eastern France. On 1 January 2017, the former commune of Gernicourt was merged into Cormicy.

See also
Communes of the Marne department

References

Communes of Marne (department)